The British Independent Film Awards 2022 were held on 4 December 2022 to recognise the best in British independent cinema and filmmaking talent from United Kingdom. The nominations were announced on 4 November 2022 by actors Sam Claflin and Kosar Ali during an event in London. Aftersun led the nominations with 16, followed by Blue Jean with 13 and The Wonder with 12. The ceremony took place at Old Billingsgate in London and was hosted by Ben Bailey Smith.

Aftersun won the most awards, winning 7 awards including the top prize, Best British Independent Film.

In July 2022, it was announced that gender-neutral categories would replace the male and female performance categories, introducing Best Lead Performance, Best Supporting Performance, Best Joint Lead Performance and Best Ensemble Performance. Additionally, the creation of Best Debut Director – Feature Documentary and the division of the Best Music category into Best Original Music and Best Music Supervision were also announced.

The longlists for Best International Independent Film, Best Documentary and the Raindance Discovery Award were announced on 21 October, while the longlists for The Douglas Hickox Award (Best Debut Director), Best Debut Director – Feature Documentary, Best Debut Screenwriter, Breakthrough Performance and Breakthrough Producer were announced on 24 October.

Winners and nominees 
The nominations were announced on November 4, 2022. The winners of the craft categories were announced on November 18, 2022. The winners for the remaining categories were announced during a ceremony on 4 December 2022.

Films with multiple nominations and awards

References

External links
Official website

British Independent Film Awards
2022 film awards
2022 in the United Kingdom